Ian Stuart Gallacher (22 May 1946 – 19 October 2014) was a Welsh dual-code international rugby union, and professional rugby league footballer who played in the 1960s and 1970s.

Rugby union playing career
Born in Llanelli, Gallacher played for Felinfoel RFC and Llanelli RFC, as a lock, i.e. number 4 or 5. He joined Llanelli RFC in 1965, and played almost 200 games for the club. At Llanelli RFC he won his only international cap for Wales, against France on 4 April 1970. He played at invitational level for Barbarian F.C.

Rugby league playing career
In 1970, he joined Bradford Northern rugby league club, moving to Keighley in January 1975. He won caps for Wales (RL) while at Keighley in 1975 against France and England, and in the 1975 Rugby League World Cup against New Zealand, and France.

Rugby union executive
He acted as chief executive of Llanelli RFC and Scarlets from 1996, before being appointed as chief executive of Regional Rugby Wales (RRW) in 2009. He stood down from the post in June 2014 because of poor health. He was also a member of the board of the European Rugby Cup.

References

1946 births
2014 deaths
Barbarian F.C. players
Bradford Bulls players
Dual-code rugby internationals
Felinfoel RFC players
Keighley Cougars players
Llanelli RFC players
Place of death missing
Rugby league players from Llanelli
Rugby league second-rows
Rugby union locks
Rugby union players from Llanelli
Wales international rugby union players
Wales national rugby league team players
Welsh rugby league players
Welsh rugby union players